Un po' di cielo is a 1955 Italian film. It stars actor Gabriele Ferzetti. Its name is Italian for "A bit of heaven".

Cast
 Gabriele Ferzetti as Frank Lo Giudice		
 Constance Smith as Nora	
 Fausto Tozzi as Roberto Maltoni
 Aldo Fabrizi as Pietro Maltoni
 Peppino De Filippo as Fabrizio Pagani 
 Tina Pica as Antonietta

References

External links

1955 films
1950s Italian-language films
Italian romantic drama films
1955 romantic drama films
1950s Italian films